Ferhat Kiraz (born 2 January 1989) is a Turkish professional footballer who plays as a left winger. Kiraz is also a youth international, capped at the U-17, U-18, U-19, and U-21 levels.

Early life and club career
Kiraz was born 2 January 1989 in the town of Bozkır in Konya Province. The same year he was born, his father moved to Austria for work. His father visits Kiraz and the rest of his family twice a year. He has a younger brother, Yusuf, a right back currently playing for Hacettepe. Kiraz began his career with local club Konya Demirspor. Sami Özdedeoğlu, then manager of the club, suggested Kiraz to Ünal Karaman, who was then manager of the Turkey national under-21 football team. Kiraz was called up to the Turkey U-16 team, and was subsequently  the subject of several inquiries from other clubs. Among them were Istanbul-giants Beşiktaş. However, Kiraz chose Gençlerbirliği instead.

Kiraz signed for Gençlerbirliği in 2005. He competed in the youth leagues before making his debut at the end of the 2006–07 season, coincidentally against the club he turned down, Beşiktaş. Kiraz made eight more appearances for the club before being loaned out to Karşıyaka at the beginning of the 2007–08 season. He made 29 appearances for the İzmir-based club, scoring seven goals. The next season, Kiraz was loaned out to feeder club Hacettepe during the winter transfer period. Kiraz scored two goals in 12 appearances with the club. Boluspor transferred Kiraz before the beginning of the 2010–11 season.

References

External links
 
 

1989 births
Living people
People from Bozkır
Turkish footballers
Gençlerbirliği S.K. footballers
Karşıyaka S.K. footballers
Boluspor footballers
Bursaspor footballers
Hacettepe S.K. footballers
Kasımpaşa S.K. footballers
Yeni Malatyaspor footballers
Eskişehirspor footballers
MKE Ankaragücü footballers
Bucaspor footballers
Süper Lig players
TFF First League players
Turkey youth international footballers
Turkey under-21 international footballers
Turkey B international footballers
Association football midfielders